Bundeshaus or Federal House may refer to:

 Federal Palace of Switzerland
 Bundeshaus (Bonn), former provisional parliament house of the Federal Republic of Germany, in Bonn
 Bundeshaus (Berlin)